The Lumiere Brothers Center for Photography is a private exhibition organization located in the former chocolate factory and acting art cluster Red October in Moscow.

Since its foundation in 2010, the center aims to explore and promote Russian and foreign photography, support emerging Russian artists and explore beyond the medium. A private collection of Natalia and Eduard Litvinsky laid the foundation for the center's collection.

Works from the Center's collection were shown at the Fotofest 2012 Biennal, triennial Bergen Assembly in 2013, Garage Museum of Contemporary Art, museum and exhibition association Moscow Manege, Jewish Museum and Tolerance Center, Tretyakov Gallery in Moscow.

The center's exhibitions were shown at the State Russian Museum and Erarta in St-Petersburg, Krasnoyarsk museum center, Cherepovets museum association, Kazan city hall, Ekaterinburg Museum of Fine Arts, and Heydar Aliyev Center in Baku, Azerbaijan.

The Lumiere Brothers Center for Photography in Red October was closed in February 2021.

Lumiere Gallery (by The Lumiere Brothers Center owners) opened a new venue in Moscow in its building on Bolshaya Polyanka in April 2021.

Exhibition programme 
For the past 19 years the gallery has amassed a vast collection of prints featuring chef d’oeuvres by renowned Soviet and the World famous artists: Alexander Rodchenko, Antanas Sutkus, Yakov Khalip, Vladimir Lagrange, Arnold Newman, Wynn Bullock, Ruth Orkin, Elliott Erwitt, Steve Schapiro, Guy Bourdin, Vivian Maier, Sabine Weiss, Harry Benson, Sheila Metzner, Miles Aldridge.

Exhibition programme is based on research activities focused on studying and interpretation of the Russian photography of the 20th century. Group exhibitions tracing the history of Russian photography from the perspective of genres (100 Years of Russian and Soviet History in Faces, PROzavod, The Moscow Stories. Twentieth century (1 and 2)) and cultural aspects (Soviet Photo, The Icons of the 1960s -1980s, The Icons of the 1990s, Time of the Little Bells) aim to put Russian photography in the context of world art history.

Selected exhibitions
 The Soviet photography 60-70: Yuri Abramochkin, Lev Borodulin, Igor Gnevashev, Naum Granovsky, Yakov Khalip, Vladimir Lagrange
 The Phenomenon of the Lithuanian photography school: Antanas Sutkus, Vitalijus Butyrinas, Aleksandras Macijauskas
 Josef Koudelka. Invasion 68: Prague
 Ruth Orkin. Retrospective
 Steve Schapiro. Living America
 Vivian Maier. Riddle
 Arno Rafael Minkkinen. Retrospective
 Arnold Newman. Portraits and Abstractions
 Sabine Weiss. Hommage à Sabine
 Elliott Erwitt. Elliott Erwitt's Kolor at Red October
 Robert Whitman. Mikhail Baryshnikov
 Giovanni Gastel. Canons of Beauty
 Ezra Stoller. Pioneers of American Modernism
 Sheila Metzner. The Magic Of Metzner
 Harry Benson. The Beatles and more
 Miles Aldridge. Taste of colour
 Alexander Rodchenko. From the Still Art Foundation Collection
 Guy Bourdin. Follow me

Collection
The collection was established 19 years ago and now contains more than 13000 prints by Russian and foreign artists.

The collection includes works by the outstanding Russian photographers of the late 19-early 20th century: Karl Bulla, Alexander Greenberg, and Yuri Eremin.

Among the collection's major works are photographs by Soviet Avant-garde artists: Alexander Rodchenko, Boris Ignatovich, Eleazar Langman, Mikhail Prekhner, Arkady Shaikhet, Georgi Petrusov, Yakov Khalip.

Publishing programme
Publications result from research activities and accompany the major projects of the center. 
Photo 60–70. Moscow: The Lumiere Brothers Center for Photography. 2008. .
Moscow of Naum Granovsky. Moscow: The Lumiere Brothers Center for Photography. 2009. .
Icons of the 1960s-1980s. Moscow: The Lumiere Brothers Center for Photography. 2010. .
Icons of the 1990s. Moscow: The Lumiere Brothers Center for Photography. 2011. .
Soviet era by Markov-Grinberg. Moscow: The Lumiere Brothers Center for Photography / Damiani. 2012. .
Time of the Little Bells. Moscow: The Lumiere Brothers Center for Photography. 2013. .
The Moscow Stories. Twentieth century. Moscow: The Lumiere Brothers Center for Photography. 2013. .
PROzavod. Industrial photography. The twentieth century. Moscow: The Lumiere Brothers Center for Photography. 2014. .
The Conquest. Yakov Khalip, Heir to the Russian Avant-Garde. Moscow: The Lumiere Brothers Center for Photography. 2016. .

Educational programme

Its educational program aims to contribute to a greater public understanding and appreciation of photography and creating opportunities for communication and collaboration between photographers, curators, amateurs and those interested in photography. The program includes guided tours, workshops, screenings, artist talks, forums. Arno Rafael Minkkinen, Steve Schapiro, Sheila Metzner, Harry Benson, Miles Aldridge, Laurent Chehere, and other prominent artists held their workshops in the center.

Photobookfest 
Photobookfest is a large-scaled international event, dedicated to the photobook industry and photographic art in Russia. The festival`s programme consist of exhibition and education blocks, as well as a Photobook dummy contest. Photobookfest hosted sessions of portfolio-review for photographers with the participation of leading international experts.

Library and café

The center includes a café and library dedicated to photography. The library houses a large collection of books by Russian and foreign publishing houses. It encompasses books on the history and theory of photography, photography techniques, back issues of magazines Soviet photo, and Ogonyek.

Bookshop PhotoBookPoster
Bookshop PhotoBookPoster has a wide range of photography books from Russian and international publishers.

References

External links

Photobookfest

Media about the Center 
 «The Iconic Photography of Guy Bourdin Now in a Moscow Survey» — Widewalls, 2020.
 «The Lumiere Brothers – Photo Exhibitions» — The Moscow Times, 2019.
 «Memorable monuments to American modernism – in pictures» — The Guardian, 2018.
 «Sebastian Copeland: “I’ve Been Attacked by Polar Bears a Few Times”» — Bird in Flight, 2018.
 «The Rich History of Soviet Photography, Told in 18 Images» — Wired, 2015.
 «Seven decades of Soviet photography – in pictures» — The Guardian, 2015.
 «Photography, propaganda, and the search for truth How Soviet photography changed over the course of 50 years» — Meduza, 2015.

Museums in Moscow
Photography museums and galleries in Russia